Robert Lea MacMillan (born December 3, 1952) is a Canadian former professional ice hockey forward and a former politician who served in the Legislative Assembly of Prince Edward Island. During his hockey career, he played two seasons in the World Hockey Association (WHA), followed by eleven seasons in the National Hockey League (NHL), from 1974–75 until 1984–85. He helped the Calgary Flames reach the NHL playoff semifinals for the first time in 1981.

Hockey career
As a youth, MacMillan played in the 1964 and 1965 Quebec International Pee-Wee Hockey Tournaments with a minor ice hockey team from Charlottetown. He was drafted 15th overall by the New York Rangers in the 1972 NHL Amateur Draft. He was traded along with Dick Redmond, Yves Bélanger and a second‐round selection in the 1979 NHL Entry Draft (23rd overall–Mike Perovich) from the St. Louis Blues to the Atlanta Flames for Phil Myre, Curt Bennett and Barry Gibbs on December 12, 1977. Upon his retirement, MacMillan returned to Charlottetown to coach senior hockey. After two years behind the bench he made a brief comeback to the ice when he dressed for two games with the Charlottetown Islanders in the 1987–88 season and scored four points.

Political career
MacMillan served in the Prince Edward Island legislature from 2000–2003, as part of Pat Binns's Progressive Conservative government.

Personal life
MacMillan is the brother of former player and coach Bill MacMillan. MacMillan is the father of Logan MacMillan, the first-round pick (19th overall) of the Anaheim Ducks in the 2007 NHL Entry Draft, Ryan MacMillan, owner of 'Chuck Hatchets', and 'The Whiskey Pub and Kitchen', and Cole MacMillan, who most recently played hockey at University of Prince Edward Island. He currently owns and operates The Sport Page Club, a sports bar in downtown Charlottetown.

Career statistics

Regular season and playoffs

References

External links
 

1952 births
Living people
Atlanta Flames players
Calgary Flames players
Canadian ice hockey right wingers
Canadian sportsperson-politicians
Chicago Blackhawks players
Colorado Rockies (NHL) players
Ice hockey people from Prince Edward Island
Lady Byng Memorial Trophy winners
Milwaukee Admirals (IHL) players
Minnesota Fighting Saints players
National Hockey League first-round draft picks
New Jersey Devils players
New York Rangers draft picks
New York Rangers players
Progressive Conservative Party of Prince Edward Island MLAs
Providence Reds players
Sportspeople from Charlottetown
St. Catharines Black Hawks players
St. Louis Blues players
21st-century Canadian politicians